Amarjit Singh Kiyam (born 6 January 2001) is an Indian professional footballer who plays as a midfielder for Indian Super League club Goa and the India national team. He also represented India in the FIFA U-17 World Cup in 2017.

Club career
Born in Manipur, Amarjit was part of the AIFF Elite Academy batch that was preparing for the 2017 FIFA U-17 World Cup to be hosted in India. He was the captain of India u17 team that played 2017 FIFA U-17 World Cup. After the tournament, Amarjit was selected to play for the Indian Arrows, an All India Football Federation-owned team that would consist of India under-20 players to give them playing time. He made his professional debut for the side in the Arrow's first match of the season against Chennai City. He started and played the whole match as Indian Arrows won 3–0. 

On 29 December 2017, Amarjit earned his first sending off after he was issued a second yellow card in the 64th minute during Indian Arrows' match against Mohun Bagan.

International career
Amarjit represented the India under-17 side which participated in the 2017 FIFA U-17 World Cup which was hosted in India. He was the captain of the Indian team in U-17 World Cup.

Amarjit represented India national team in the 2019 King's Cup on June 5 in the opening match against Curaçao as he came as a substitute for Pronay Halder. He became the first player to born after 2000 to play in the senior team. He was named in the squad for the 2022 FIFA World Cup Qualifier games against Oman and Qatar in September 2019, but had to leave the squad due to an arm injury.

Personal life
His cousin Jeakson Singh is also a professional footballer currently playing for Kerala Blasters. Both of them represented the India national under-17 team in the 2017 FIFA U-17 World Cup India where Jeakson scored India's first ever goal in a FIFA tournament. His cousin sister, Kritina Devi Thounaojam also represented India in youth teams. He has made history as a youngster, moving from the India U-17 team to the senior squad in only 2 years.

Style of play 
He has been praised for his passing ability and excellence on the ball.

Career statistics

Club

International

Honours

India
 King's Cup third place: 2019

References

2001 births
Living people
Indian Super League players
People from Thoubal district
Indian footballers
AIFF Elite Academy players
Indian Arrows players
Association football midfielders
Footballers from Manipur
I-League players
India youth international footballers
Jamshedpur FC players